Anthony Mitchell (born ; died 5 May 2007) was a journalist for the Associated Press.  He was initially stationed in Ethiopia, but on 21 January 2006 he was expelled from the country by government press secretary Solomon Abebe.  He then moved to Kenya.

Mitchell died on Kenya Airways Flight 507 when it crashed in Cameroon with 114 passengers and crew.

He is buried in Chertsey Cemetery in Surrey.

References

External links
A collection of articles by and about Anthony Mitchell

2007 deaths
Associated Press reporters
Male journalists
People deported from Ethiopia
Victims of aviation accidents or incidents in Cameroon
Victims of aviation accidents or incidents in 2007
Year of birth uncertain